Waterfront Communications A/S (or just Waterfront) is a Danish PR- and Lobbying Bureau, and was created in 1993 by the former member of the European Parliament Lars Poulsen. The bureau is a part of the worldwide media network Media Consulta. The company is located in Hellerup, north of Copenhagen.

Controversy 

At the 13 January 2013 an internal mail correspondence, was revealed by the Danish news magazine "21 Sunday", that the Danish Railway Operator (DSB) had hired Waterfront to keep the freelance journalist Lars Abild engaged in something else than writing about DSB.

References 

Public relations companies of Denmark
Service companies based in Copenhagen
Danish companies established in 1993